St. Joseph Church is a Roman Catholic church in the town of Edinburgh of the Seven Seas on the island of Tristan da Cunha, one of those that make up the British overseas territory of Saint Helena, Ascension and Tristan da Cunha in the Southern Atlantic Ocean.

The church follows the Roman Rite or Latin rite and is part of the jurisdiction of the Mission sui juris of Saint Helena, Ascension and Tristan da Cunha (Missio sui iuris Sanctae Helenae, Ascensionis et Tristanensis).

This is one of three Catholic churches operating in that territory, the others being those located in Cat Hill, near Wideawake Airfield, on Ascension Island (Church of Our Lady of the Ascension) and Jamestown on the island of St Helena (Sacred Heart Church). It is one of the most remote Catholic churches in the world.

History
Built in 1995–96, the present church replaced a smaller one built in 1983. The Catholic faith was brought to the island in 1908 by two Irish women, Elizabeth and Agnes Smith. Dereck Rogers, Anne Green and James Glass, all lay preachers of the church, are grandsons of Agnes Smith.

See also
Roman Catholicism in Tristan da Cunha
St. Joseph Church

References

Roman Catholic churches in Saint Helena, Ascension and Tristan da Cunha
Tristan da Cunha
Roman Catholic churches completed in 1996
Buildings and structures in Edinburgh of the Seven Seas
20th-century Roman Catholic church buildings in the United Kingdom